The Reference Daily Intake (RDI) used in nutrition labeling on food and dietary supplement products in the U.S. and Canada is the daily intake level of a nutrient that is considered to be sufficient to meet the requirements of 97–98% of healthy individuals in every demographic in the United States. While developed for the US population, it has been adopted by other countries, though not universally.

The RDI is used to determine the Daily Value (DV) of foods, which is printed on nutrition facts labels (as % DV) in the United States and Canada, and is regulated by the Food and Drug Administration (FDA) and by Health Canada respectively. The labels "high", "rich in", or "excellent source of" may be used for a food if it contains 20% or more of the RDI. The labels "good source", "contains", or "provides" may be used on a food if it contains between 10% and 20% of the RDI.

The Recommended Dietary Allowances (RDAs) were a set of nutrition recommendations that evolved into both the Dietary Reference Intake (DRI) system of nutrition recommendations (which still defines RDA values) and the RDIs used for food labeling. The first regulations governing U.S. nutrition labels specified a % U.S. RDA declaration based on the current RDA values, which had been published in 1968. Later, the % U.S. RDA was renamed the %DV and the RDA values that the %DVs were based on became the RDIs.

The RDAs (and later the RDA values within the DRI) were regularly revised to reflect the latest scientific information, but although the nutrition labeling regulations were occasionally updated, the existing RDI values were not changed, so that until 2016, many of the DVs used on nutrition facts labels were still based on the outdated RDAs from 1968. In 2016, the Food and Drug Administration published changes to the regulations including updated RDIs and DVs based primarily on the RDAs in the current DRI.

Food labeling reference tables 
The reference dietary intake (RDI) gives numbers based on gender and age. The Daily Value (DV) is put on the labels of food products and is meant for the general population.

Daily Values
The FDA issued a final rule on changes to the facts panel on May 27, 2016. The new values were published in the Federal Register. The original deadline to be in compliance was July 28, 2018, but on May 4, 2018, the FDA released a final rule that extended the deadline to January 1, 2020, for manufacturers with $10 million or more in annual food sales, and by January 1, 2021, for manufacturers with less than $10 million in annual food sales. During the first six months following the January 1, 2020 compliance date, the FDA worked cooperatively with manufacturers to meet the new Nutrition Facts label requirements, and did not focus on enforcement actions regarding these requirements during that time. Due to lengthy shelf-life on certain food items, products containing old or new facts panel content may be on market shelves at the same time.

The following table lists the old and new DVs based on a caloric intake of 2000 kcal (8400 kJ), for adults and children four or more years of age.

Dietary Reference Intake
For vitamins and minerals, the old RDIs and new RDIs (old and new adult 100% Daily Values) are given in the following tables.

Vitamins and choline

Minerals

History 
The RDI is derived from the RDAs, which were first developed during World War II by Lydia J. Roberts, Hazel Stiebeling and Helen S. Mitchell, all part of a committee established by the U.S. National Academy of Sciences to investigate issues of nutrition that might "affect national defense" (Nestle, 35). The committee was renamed the Food and Nutrition Board in 1941, after which they began to deliberate on a set of recommendations of a standard daily allowance for each type of nutrient. The standards would be used for nutrition recommendations for the armed forces, for civilians, and for overseas population who might need food relief. Roberts, Stiebeling, and Mitchell surveyed all available data, created a tentative set of allowances for "energy and eight nutrients", and submitted them to experts for review (Nestle, 35). The final set of guidelines, called RDAs for Recommended Dietary Allowances, were accepted in 1941. The allowances were meant to provide superior nutrition for civilians and military personnel, so they included a "margin of safety". Because of food rationing during the war, the food guides created by government agencies to direct citizens' nutritional intake also took food availability into account.

The Food and Nutrition Board subsequently revised the RDAs every five to ten years. In 1973, the FDA introduced regulations to specify the format of nutrition labels when present, although the inclusion of such labels was largely voluntary, only being required if nutrition claims were made or if nutritional supplements were added to the food. The nutrition labels were to include percent U.S. RDA based on the 1968 RDAs in effect at the time. The RDAs continued to be updated (in 1974, 1980 and 1989) but the values specified for nutrition labeling remained unchanged.

In 1993 the FDA published new regulations mandating the inclusion of a nutrition facts label on most packaged foods. Originally the FDA had proposed replacing the percent U.S. RDAs with percent daily values based on the 1989 RDAs but the Dietary Supplement Act of 1992 prevented it from doing so. Instead it introduced the RDI to be the basis of the new daily values. The RDI consisted of the existing U.S. RDA values (still based on the 1968 RDAs as the FDA was not allowed to change them at the time) and new values for additional nutrients not included in the 1968 RDAs.

In 1997, at the suggestion of the Institute of Medicine of the National Academy, the RDAs became one part of a broader set of dietary guidelines called the Dietary Reference Intake used by both the United States and Canada. As part of the DRI, the RDAs continued to be updated.

On May 27, 2016, the FDA updated the regulations to change the RDI and Daily Values to reflect current scientific information. Until this time, the Daily Values were still largely based on the 1968 RDAs. The new regulations make several other changes to the nutrition facts label to facilitate consumer understanding of the calorie and nutrient contents of their foods, emphasizing nutrients of current concern, such as vitamin D and potassium. The revision to the regulations came into effect on 26 July 2016 and initially stipulated that larger manufacturers must comply within two years while smaller manufacturers had an additional year. On May 4, 2018, the FDA released a final rule that extended the deadline to January 1, 2020, for large companies and to January 1, 2021, for small companies. During the first six months following the January 1, 2020 compliance date, the FDA worked cooperatively with manufacturers to meet the new Nutrition Facts label requirements, and did not focus on enforcement actions regarding these requirements during that time. In the interim, products containing old or new facts panel content may be on market shelves at the same time.

Sodium and potassium

In 2010, the U.S. Institute of Medicine determined that the government should establish new consumption standards for salt to reduce the amount of sodium in the typical American diet below levels associated with higher risk of several cardiovascular diseases, yet maintain consumer preferences for salt-flavored food. In 1999, the average American adult ingested nearly 4,000 mg of sodium daily, far above the National Research Council recommendation that the general U.S. population consume no more than 2,400 mg of sodium (or 6 grams of salt) per day. For instance, the National Research Council found that 500 milligrams of sodium per day (approximately 1,250 milligrams of table salt) is a safe minimum level. In the United Kingdom, the daily allowance for salt is 6 g (approximately 2.5 teaspoons, about the upper limit in the U.S.), an amount considered "too high".

The Institute of Medicine advisory stated (daily intake basis): "Americans consume more than 3,400 milligrams of sodium – the amount in about 1.5 teaspoons of salt (8.7 g) – each day. The recommended maximum daily intake of sodium – the amount above which health problems appear – is 2,300 milligrams per day for adults, about 1 teaspoon of salt (5.9 g). The recommended adequate intake of sodium is 1,500 milligrams (3.9 g salt) per day, and people over 50 need even less."

The daily value for potassium, 4,700 mg per day, was based on a small study of men who were given 14.6 g of sodium chloride per day and treated with potassium supplements until the frequency of salt sensitivity was reduced to 20 percent.

See also 
Canada's Food Guide
Dietary mineral

Essential amino acid
Essential fatty acid
Essential nutrient

Healthy diet

Vitamins

Notes

References

External links 
 Daily Values, US National Institutes of Health

Dietary minerals
Nutrition
Vitamins